The Republic of Poland Ambassador to Denmark is the Poland's foremost diplomatic representative in Denmark, and head of the Poland's diplomatic mission in Denmark. He is the highest Poland's diplomatic representative to the Queen and the Government of the Kingdom of Denmark.

As with all Poland Ambassadors, the ambassador to Denmark is nominated by the President of Poland and confirmed by the Parliamentary Commission of the Foreign Affairs. The ambassador serves at the pleasure of the President, and enjoys full diplomatic immunity.

Poland Embassy in Denmark is located in Copenhagen.

List of ambassadors of Poland to Denmark

Second Polish Republic 

 1919–1924: Aleksander Maria Dzieduszycki (envoy)
 1924: Kazimierz Papée (chargé d’affaires)
 1924–1928: Konstanty Rozwadowski (envoy)
 1928–1931: Zygmunt Michałowski (envoy)
 1936–1936: Michał Sokolnicki (envoy)
 1936–1940: Jan Starzewski (envoy)

April 5, 1940 – close-down of the embassy due to the German Occupation of Denmark

People's Polish Republic 

 1945–1946: Piotr Szamański (chargé d’affaires)
 1946–1954: Stanisław Kelles-Krauz (envoy)
 1954–1957: Józef Dryblas (envoy)
 1957–1963: Stanisław Dobrowolski
 1963–1968: Romuald Poleszczuk
 1968–1973: Henryk Wendrowski
 1973–1978: Stanisław Pichla
 1978–1981: Bohdan Trąmpczyński
 1981–1984: Tadeusz Wujek
 1984–1989: Lucjan Piątkowski

Third Polish Republic 

 1989–1991: Janusz Roszkowski
 1991–1997: Jerzy Sito
 1997–2001: Jan Górecki
 2001–2005: Barbara Tuge-Erecińska
 2005–2006: Jakub Wolski
 2006–2010: Adam Halamski
 2010–2015: Rafał Wiśniewski
 2015–2020: Henryka Mościcka-Dendys
 2020–2022: Mateusz Mońko (chargé d’affaires a.i.)
 since 2022: Antoni Fałkowski

References 

 
Denmark
Poland